The Central District of Shabestar County is in East Azerbaijan province, Iran. At the National Census in 2006, its population was 64,312 in 17,772 households. The following census in 2011 counted 70,218 people in 20,952 households. At the latest census in 2016, the district had 78,933 inhabitants in 25,441 households.

References 

Shabestar County

Districts of East Azerbaijan Province

Populated places in East Azerbaijan Province

Populated places in Shabestar County